"Bluebird Island" is a country music song written by Hank Snow, recorded by Snow and Anita Carter, and released on the RCA Victor label. In April 1951, it reached No. 4 on the country charts. It spent 11 weeks on the charts and was the No. 18 best selling country record of 1951.

See also
 List of Billboard Top Country & Western Records of 1951

References

Hank Snow songs
1951 songs
Songs written by Hank Snow